Marion County High School is a public, secondary school located in Lebanon, Kentucky, United States. It is the only high school in the Marion County Schools district. MCHS houses grades 9–12 and has an enrollment of 653 students.

AP courses
MCHS offers the following Advanced Placement courses:

 AP Language
 AP Literature
 AP Calculus
 AP European History
 AP US History
 AP Comparative Gov.
 AP Human Geography
 AP Psychology

Career majors
MCHS students may elect to pursue a career major. These students take courses pertaining to a career field of interest in addition to their regular high school studies. Majors offered include agriculture education, animal science, horticulture, communication and leadership, accounting, administrative support, business management, technology education, PLTW pre-engineering, early childhood education, culinary and food services, fashion and interior design, and consumer and family management.

In addition, students may elect to pursue the following career majors at the adjacent Marion County Area Tech Center (MCATC): automotive technology, construction technology, health sciences, industrial maintenance technology, information technology, machine tool technology, and welding technology.

Extracurricular activities
The following extracurricular activities are offered at MCHS:
Academic Team
Band
BETA
Family Career and Community Leaders (FCCLA)
Future Business Leaders of America (FBLA)
Future Farmers of America (FFA)
Health Occupation Students of America (HOSA)
National Honor Society (NHS)
SkillsUSA
Student Council
Student Technology Leadership Program (STLP)
Technology Student Association (TSA)
Teen Leadership Marion County (TLMC)

Athletics
The Marion County Knights and Lady Knights compete in the Kentucky High School Athletic Association in the following sports:
Baseball
Basketball - Boys and Girls
Cheerleading
Cross Country - Boys and Girls
Football
Golf - Boys and Girls
Soccer - Boys and Girls
Softball
Swimming - Boys and Girls
Tennis - Boys and Girls
Track - Boys and Girls
Volleyball - Boys and Girls

References

External links
 Marion County Schools Homepage

Public high schools in Kentucky
Education in Marion County, Kentucky
Lebanon, Kentucky